The Lewiston Public Library is a historic public Carnegie library at Park and Pine Street in Lewiston, Maine.

History

In 1902 Andrew Carnegie donated $60,000 for a new granite building with the understanding that the city would fund staff, books, and materials. Granite was acquired from North Jay and Norridgewock to be used for the construction. The vestibule was modeled after the Greek design with columns 18 feet high and 25 inches in circumference. Woodwork of fine oak is found on the fireplace mantels and oak pillars. 
The original library located in Lewiston City Hall was known as the Manufacturers and Mechanics Library. The library was formed on January 26, 1861, and existed until the first Lewiston City Hall burned on January 7, 1890. The current library still has several volumes that have the Manufacturers and Mechanics library stamps in them.

Design
The Colonial Revival library building was constructed in 1902 by Coombs & Gibbs. The building was added to the National Register of Historic Places in 1978.

Expansion

The building was significantly renovated in 1996, including moving the main entrance one block to the west. The Marsden Hartley Cultural Center was opened in 2005 and is named for Lewiston's native son Marsden Hartley, a renowned artist/poet.

See also
National Register of Historic Places listings in Androscoggin County, Maine

References

External links
Lewiston Public Library official website
City of Lewiston

Library buildings completed in 1902
Public libraries in Maine
Libraries on the National Register of Historic Places in Maine
Educational buildings in Lewiston, Maine
Education in Lewiston, Maine
Tourist attractions in Lewiston, Maine
Government buildings on the National Register of Historic Places in Maine
Libraries in Androscoggin County, Maine
Carnegie libraries in Maine
National Register of Historic Places in Lewiston, Maine